LeBaron Bradford Prince (July 3, 1840December 8, 1922) was an American lawyer and politician who served as chief justice of the New Mexico Territorial Supreme Court from 1878 to 1882, and as the 14th Governor of New Mexico Territory from 1889 to 1893.

Biography
Prince was born on July 3, 1840, in Flushing, Queens, New York. His parents were horticulturist William Robert Prince and his wife, Charlotte Goodwin (Collins) Prince. Young Prince started his career working in nurseries run by his father and brother.  The nurseries were sold at the end of the Civil War, and he studied law at Columbia University, where he received an LL.B. in 1866.

He was a delegate to Republican National Convention from New York in  1868. He was a member of the New York State Assembly (Queens Co., 1st D.) in 1871, 1872, 1873, 1874 and 1875. He was a member of the New York State Senate (1st D.) in 1876 and 1877.

In the Republican National Convention of 1876, he was among those who supported Rutherford B. Hayes over Roscoe Conkling. That resulted him being given the opportunity to be governor of the Territory of Idaho. He passed on that option but later became a chief justice of the New Mexico Territorial Supreme Court from 1878 to 1882. In 1883, he became president of the New Mexico Historical Society.

President Benjamin Harrison appointed Prince to Governor of New Mexico Territory from 1889 to 1893. Prince and his wife, Mary, resided in the Palace of the Governors and held social functions there.

Prince led the movement to create the Spanish American Normal School and served as President of its governing board from 1909–1912.

He was a member of New Mexico Territorial Council in 1909 and a delegate to the New Mexico State Constitutional Convention of 1911.

He was a member of the New Mexico Horticultural Society, the Society for the Preservation of Spanish Antiquities, the New Mexico Archaeological Society, the Society of the Cincinnati, Sons of the Revolution, the Society of Colonial Wars and the Protestant Episcopal Church.

In 1879, he married Hattie E. Childs, who died in 1880.  In 1881, he married Mary C. Beardsley. They had one child.

Prince died at Flushing Hospital in Queens on December 8, 1922.

Works

E Pluribus Unum: The Articles of Confederation vs. the Constitution (1867)
The General Laws of New Mexico (1880)
A Nation or a League (1880)
Historical Sketches of New Mexico (1883)
The American Church and Its Name (1887)
The Money Problem (1896)
The Stone Lions of Cochiti (1903)
Old Fort Marcy (1911)
A Concise History of New Mexico (1912)
The Student's History of New Mexico (1913)
Spanish Mission Churches of New Mexico (1915)
Abraham Lincoln, the Man (1917)

References

External links

 

1840 births
1922 deaths
Governors of New Mexico Territory
Members of the New Mexico Territorial Legislature
Republican Party members of the New York State Assembly
New York (state) state senators
New Mexico Territory judges
American Episcopalians
New Mexico Republicans
Columbia Law School alumni
Justices of the New Mexico Supreme Court